Anthony Wayne is a gilded bronze equestrian sculpture of Anthony Wayne, by John Gregory at the Philadelphia Museum of Art. 
It is located at 26th Street and the Benjamin Franklin Parkway.
It was dedicated on September 17, 1937.

The inscription reads:
(Base, plaques on both north and south sides:) 
Sons of the Revolution
Exegi Monumentum Aere Perennius 1776-1883 
(Base, north side above plaque, in raised letters:) 
Anthony Wayne
1745-1796 
The inscription at the foot of base reads:
Anthony Wayne
A memorial of his valour
a tribute to his achievements
in the War of Independence
The Pennsylvania Society
Sons of the Revolution
Here inscribe his name
in honor
1937.

See also
List of public art in Philadelphia

References

External links
 

Monuments and memorials in Philadelphia
Outdoor sculptures in Philadelphia
1937 sculptures
Bronze sculptures in Pennsylvania
Equestrian statues in Pennsylvania
Sculptures in the collection of the Philadelphia Museum of Art
Sculptures of men in Pennsylvania
1937 establishments in Pennsylvania
Equestrian statues in Philadelphia
East Fairmount Park